In linear algebra, the computation of the permanent of a matrix is a problem that is thought to be more difficult than the computation of the determinant of a matrix despite the apparent similarity of the definitions.

The permanent is defined similarly to the determinant, as a sum of products of sets of matrix entries that lie in distinct rows and columns. However, where the determinant weights each of these products with a ±1 sign based on the parity of the set, the permanent weights them all with a +1 sign.

While the determinant can be computed in polynomial time by Gaussian elimination, it is generally believed that the permanent cannot be computed in polynomial time. In computational complexity theory, a theorem of Valiant states that computing permanents is #P-hard, and even #P-complete for matrices in which all entries are 0 or 1 . This puts the computation of the permanent in a class of problems believed to be even more difficult to compute than NP. It is known that computing the permanent is impossible for logspace-uniform ACC0 circuits.

The development of both exact and approximate algorithms for computing the permanent of a matrix is an active area of research.

Definition and naive algorithm
The permanent of an n-by-n matrix A = (ai,j) is defined as

 

The sum here extends over all elements σ of the symmetric group Sn, i.e. over all permutations of the numbers 1, 2, ..., n. This formula differs from the corresponding formula for the determinant only in that, in the determinant, each product is multiplied by the sign of the permutation σ while in this formula each product is unsigned. The formula may be directly translated into an algorithm that naively expands the formula, summing over all permutations and within the sum multiplying out each matrix entry. This requires n! n arithmetic operations.

Ryser formula
Then

It may be rewritten in terms of the matrix entries as follows
 

Balasubramanian–Bax–Franklin–Glynn formula
Another formula that appears to be as fast as Ryser's (or perhaps even twice as fast) is to be found in the two Ph.D. theses; see , ; also
. The methods to find the formula are quite different, being related to the combinatorics of the Muir algebra, and to finite difference theory respectively.  Another way, connected with invariant theory is via the polarization identity for a symmetric tensor .  The formula generalizes to infinitely many others, as found by all these authors, although it is not clear if they are any faster than the basic one. See .

The simplest known formula of this type (when the characteristic of the field is not two) is
 
where the outer sum is over all  vectors .

Special cases

Planar and K3,3-free
The number of perfect matchings in a bipartite graph is counted by the permanent of the graph's biadjacency matrix, and the permanent of any 0-1 matrix can be interpreted in this way as the number of perfect matchings in a graph. For planar graphs (regardless of bipartiteness), the FKT algorithm computes the number of perfect matchings in polynomial time by changing the signs of a carefully chosen subset of the entries in the Tutte matrix of the graph, so that the Pfaffian of the resulting skew-symmetric matrix (the square root of its determinant) is the number of perfect matchings. This technique can be generalized to graphs that contain no subgraph homeomorphic to the complete bipartite graph K3,3.

George Pólya had asked the question of when it is possible to change the signs of some of the entries of a 01 matrix A so that the determinant of the new matrix is the permanent of A. Not all 01 matrices are "convertible" in this manner; in fact it is known that there is no linear map  such that  for all  matrices . The characterization of "convertible" matrices was given by  who showed that such matrices are precisely those that are the biadjacency matrix of bipartite graphs that have a Pfaffian orientation: an orientation of the edges such that for every even cycle  for which  has a perfect matching, there are an odd number of edges directed along C (and thus an odd number with the opposite orientation).

Computation modulo a number
However, it is UP-hard to compute the permanent modulo any number that is not a power of 2. 

First, there is one using symbolic calculations with partial derivatives.

Second, for  = 3 there is the following formula  for an n×n-matrix , involving the matrix's principal minors: 

where  is the submatrix of  induced by the rows and columns of 

The expansion above can be generalized in an arbitrary characteristic p as the following pair of dual identities:

where in both formulas the sum is taken over all the (p − 1)-tuples  that are partitions of the set  into p − 1 subsets, some of them possibly empty.

The former formula possesses an analog for the hafnian of a symmetric  and an odd p:

 
with the sum taken over the same set of indexes. Moreover, in characteristic zero  a similar convolution sum expression involving both the permanent and the determinant yields the Hamiltonian cycle polynomial (defined as  where  is the set of n-permutations having only one cycle):

In characteristic 2 the latter equality turns into  what therefore provides an opportunity to polynomial-time calculate the Hamiltonian cycle polynomial of any unitary  (i.e. such that  where  is the identity n×n-matrix), because each minor of such a matrix coincides with its algebraic complement:  where  is the identity n×n-matrix with the entry of indexes 1,1 replaced by 0.

This formula also implies the following identities over fields of characteristic 3:

for any invertible 

for any unitary , that is, a square matrix  such that  where  is the identity matrix of the corresponding size,

It was also shown that, if we define a square matrix  as k-semi-unitary when , the permanent of a 1-semi-unitary matrix is computable in polynomial time over fields of characteristic 3, while for  > 1 the problem becomes #3-P-complete. (A parallel theory concerns the Hamiltonian cycle polynomial in characteristic 2: while computing it on the unitary matrices is polynomial-time feasible, the problem is #2-P-complete for the k-semi-unitary ones for any k > 0).

and it allows to polynomial-time reduce the computation of the permanent of an n×n-matrix with a subset of k or k − 1 rows expressible as linear combinations of another (disjoint) subset of k rows to the computation of the permanent of an (n − k)×(n − k)- or (n − k + 1)×(n − k + 1)-matrix correspondingly, hence having introduced a compression operator (analogical to the Gaussian modification applied for calculating the determinant) that "preserves" the permanent in characteristic 3. (Analogically, it would be worth noting that the Hamiltonian cycle polynomial in characteristic 2 does possess its invariant matrix compressions as well, taking into account the fact that ham(A) = 0 for any n×n-matrix A having three equal rows or, if n > 2, a pair of indexes i,j such that its i-th and j-th rows are identical and its i-th and j-th columns are identical too.) The closure of that operator defined as the limit of its sequential application together with the transpose transformation (utilized each time the operator leaves the matrix intact) is also an operator mapping, when applied to classes of matrices, one class to another.

Besides, the problem of finding and classifying any possible analogs of the permanent-preserving compressions existing in characteristic 3 for other prime characteristics was formulated, while giving the following identity for an n×n matrix  and two n-vectors (having all their entries from the set {0, ..., p − 1})  and  such that , valid in an arbitrary prime characteristic p:

where for an n×m-matrix , an n-vector  and an m-vector , both vectors having all their entries from the set {0, ..., p − 1},  denotes the matrix received from  via repeating  times its i-th row for i = 1, ..., n and  times its j-th column for j = 1, ..., m (if some row's or column's multiplicity equals zero it would mean that the row or column was removed, and thus this notion is a generalization of the notion of submatrix), and  denotes the n-vector all whose entries equal unity. This identity is an exact analog of the classical formula expressing a matrix's minor through a minor of its inverse and hence demonstrates (once more) a kind of duality between the determinant and the permanent as relative immanants. (Actually its own analogue for the hafnian of a symmetric  and an odd prime p is ).

Approximate computation
When the entries of A are nonnegative, the permanent can be computed approximately in probabilistic polynomial time, up to an error of εM, where M is the value of the permanent and ε > 0 is arbitrary. In other words, there exists a fully polynomial-time randomized approximation scheme (FPRAS).

The most difficult step in the computation is the construction of an algorithm to sample almost uniformly from the set of all perfect matchings in a given bipartite graph: in other words, a fully polynomial almost uniform sampler (FPAUS). This can be done using a Markov chain Monte Carlo algorithm that uses a Metropolis rule to define and run a Markov chain whose distribution is close to uniform, and whose mixing time is polynomial.

The number  is then , where  can be approximated by applying the same method recursively.

Another class of matrices for which the permanent can be computed approximately, is the set of positive-semidefinite matrices (the complexity-theoretic problem of approximating the permanent of such matrices to within a multiplicative error is considered open). The corresponding randomized algorithm is based on the model of boson sampling and it uses the tools proper to quantum optics, to represent the permanent of positive-semidefinite matrices as the expected value of a specific random variable. The latter is then approximated by its sample mean. This algorithm, for a certain set of positive-semidefinite matrices, approximates their permanent in polynomial time up to an additive error, which is more reliable than that of the standard classical polynomial-time algorithm by Gurvits.

Notes

References

Further reading
 .

Computational complexity theory
Linear algebra
Matrix theory
Permutations
Computational problems